Stadion Hadzhi Dimitar is a multi-purpose stadium in Sliven, Bulgaria. It is currently used for football matches and is the home ground of OFC Sliven 2000. The stadium holds 10,000 people.
The stadium is a part of a big multifunctional sport complex, which includes a swimming pool, tennis courts, 2 training pitches and a 4-star hotel.
The athletic track of the stadium meets all of the IAAF requirements to host international competitions.
The stadium complex also has the only training pitch with FieldTurf flooring in Bulgaria.

In 2008, due to the promotion of OFC Sliven 2000 in the A PFG, plastic seats were installed in the stands of the stadium.

In 2009, the mayor of Sliven, Yordan Letchkov, announced that he plans also to install electric lighting to the stadium, right before the start of the new football campaign.

References

External links
 Unofficial website of the football club

Hadzhi Dimitar
Sliven
Multi-purpose stadiums in Bulgaria
Buildings and structures in Sliven Province
1959 establishments in Bulgaria
Sports venues completed in 1959